Helen Lindquist Bonny (1921 – May 25, 2010) was a music therapist who developed "Guided Imagery and Music" often referred to as "GIM".
Music therapist Kenneth Bruscia uses the following definition to describe Guided Imagery and Music:

"(GIM) refers to all forms of music-imaging in an expanded state of consciousness, including not only the specific individual and group forms that Bonny developed, but also all variations and modifications in those forms created by her followers."

Helen Bonny studied with E. Thayer Gaston at the University of Kansas in the early 1960s, where she received her bachelor's degree in music education, with a major in music therapy. She continued on to receive a master's degree in music education with an emphasis in research. 
After completing her PhD in the late 1960s, she began researching the effects of music on imagination, and in 1973 authored a book, co-written with Louis Savary, entitled "Music and Your Mind: Listening with a New Consciousness"

Although Guided Imagery and Music draws from various schools of psychology, Helen Bonny has cited as its main influences the humanistic and the transpersonal psychology of Carl Rogers, and Abraham Maslow. Bonny was also profoundly influenced by the work of Carl Jung.

Helen Bonny's grandson, Miles Bonny, is an active recording musician in Kansas City, Mo.

References

External links

2010 deaths
University of Kansas alumni
Music therapists
1921 births